Park Sung-Ja (born 26 August 1980) is a Korean former judoka who competed in the 2000 Summer Olympics.

References

1980 births
Living people
Olympic judoka of South Korea
Judoka at the 2000 Summer Olympics
South Korean female judoka
Universiade medalists in judo
Universiade silver medalists for South Korea
21st-century South Korean women